St. Thomas Aquinas Chapel is a former Catholic chapel located in Ojai, in Ventura County of southern California. It now houses the city's museum, research library, and historical society.

History

Church
The St. Thomas Aquinas Chapel was designed by regionally renowned San Diego architect Richard Requa, and Frank Mead, in the Mission Revival with Spanish Colonial Revival style. It was built in 1918 to replace Ojai's original wooden Catholic church that had been destroyed by fire.  Requa also designed the Mission—Spanish Colonial styled downtown Arcade and Watchtower landmarks, as part of civic leader Edward Drummond Libbey's early 20th century Ojai city beautification project.

Transition
In 1963, the parish outgrew the downtown facility and moved to Meiners Oaks. By the early 1990s, the historic chapel was described as "cracked and crumbling to its foundation, and temporarily locked behind a rented chain-link fence."  In 1990 church officials considered demolishing the chapel and selling the land. City officials and historical and architectural preservationists responded by seeking funding to acquire and preserve the building.

In 1993 the City of Ojai purchased the historic chapel and parish hall from the Catholic Church for $385,000.  The city restored and renovated the building for use by Ojai city and Ojai Valley non-profit organizations.  The Aquinas chapel was added to the National Register of Historic Places in 1995.

Current civic uses
The St. Thomas Aquinas Chapel building now houses the Ojai Valley Museum, Ojai Valley Historical Society, and the Ojai Valley Museum Research Library. The museum exhibits collections of vintage Ojai pioneer artifacts and photographs, Chumash Native American baskets, and contemporary art.

See also
 List of Registered Historic Places in Ventura County, California

References

External links

Ojai Valley Museum website
 Ojai Valley History Timeline: interactive website

Churches in Ventura County, California
Museums in Ventura County, California
Ojai, California
Former churches in California
History museums in California
National Register of Historic Places in Ventura County, California
Properties of religious function on the National Register of Historic Places in California
History of Ventura County, California
Roman Catholic churches completed in 1918
20th-century Roman Catholic church buildings in the United States
Former Roman Catholic church buildings in California
Roman Catholic churches in California
Mission Revival architecture in California
Spanish Colonial Revival architecture in California
Roman Catholic chapels in the United States
Buildings and structures in Ojai, California